The Integrated Farm Management Program (IFMP) was a program authorized by the 1990 farm bill (P.L. 101-624) to assist producers in adopting resource-conserving crop rotations by protecting participants’ base acreage, payment yields, and program payments. The 1996 farm bill (P.L. 104-127) replaced the IFMP with production flexibility contracts and a pilot conservation farm option program.

See also 
Dairy Export Incentive Program

References

External links 

United States Department of Agriculture programs